Diaphorolepis laevis, the  Colombian frog-eating snake, is a species of snake in the family Colubridae. The species is native to Colombia.

References

Diaphorolepis
Snakes of South America
Reptiles described in 1923
Endemic fauna of Colombia
Reptiles of Colombia]
Taxa named by Franz Werner